Leonid Sigal is a Russian violinist and conductor.

A graduate from the Moscow Conservatory, Sigal is active in the United States, where he settled as he joined in 1995 the New World Symphony Orchestra. He was appointed the orchestra's Concertmaster, and was trained as a conductor by Michael Tilson Thomas. He subsequently served as an Associate Concertmaster at the Florida Philharmonic Orchestra, and the Miami Chamber Symphony's Artistic Director (2001–04). He has been the Hartford Symphony Orchestra's Concertmaster since 2005.

Apart from this chairs, he has performed internationally as a soloist and chamber musician. Sigal teaches at The Hartt School.

References

Russian classical violinists
Living people
University of Hartford Hartt School faculty
21st-century classical violinists
Year of birth missing (living people)